A list of films produced in Italy in 1941 (see 1941 in film):

References

External links
 Italian films of 1941 at the Internet Movie Database

Italian
1941
Films